Picture of You is the debut studio album by English singer-songwriter Ben Mills, who finished in third place on the third series of The X Factor in December 2006. The album was released on 12 March 2007 and entered the UK Albums Chart at number three with first week sales of 63,342, before dropping to number 14 the following week.

Background
On 24 January 2007, six weeks after finishing in third place on the third series of The X Factor, it was announced that Mills had signed a five-album record deal with Sony BMG, who had also signed up winner Leona Lewis and runner-up Ray Quinn, and would be releasing his debut album in March of that year. The album was announced to be containing both original material and covers. In a statement, Mills said, "The X Factor was the perfect platform to gain recognition and I'm really enjoying writing and recording this album."

Critical reception
The album received mostly negative reviews from music critics. Entertainment Scene 360's Eleanor O'Donnell, who voted for Mills every week on The X Factor, stated that "The flouncy new image coupled with these weak, busy yet placid songs and soulless vocal performances on his debut album makes Mills an artist I will not continue to support in the future and this an album I cannot recommend." Chris Jones of BBC Music wrote that "...the relentless freak show-cum-faux 'talent' show that we love to gawp at on a Saturday night seems to have actually found someone who may survive the cruel seas of tabloid popularity and become a voice to remember." In a 2.5/5 star review, Sharon Mawer of AllMusic commended Mills for his versions of "Maggie May" and "With a Little Help from My Friends" and "Somebody to Love", but admitted that his original songs "...were not of the same quality as the covers, nearly half of which he had sung on the show, thereby making his versions well known in their own right."

Track listing
"Beside You"
"Amazed"
"Nothing but the Truth"
"Maggie May"
"Anytime You Fall"
"Love Waits for Me"
"Don't Wanna Miss a Thing"
"Somebody to Love"
"The Last to Fall"
"Bring It On Home to Me"
"Picture of You"
"With a Little Help from My Friends"

Credits and personnel
(Credits taken from AllMusic and Picture of Yous liner notes.)

 Dick Beetham - mastering
 Hamish Brown - photography
 David Daniels - cello
 Julian Deane - guitar
 John Lennon - composer
 Perry Mason - leader
 Cliff Masterson - conductor, string arrangements
 Paul Meehan - producer
 Freddie Mercury - composer
 Ben Mills - piano, primary artist
 Pino Palladino - bass
 Martin Quittenton - composer
 Brian Rawling - producer
 Carmen Reece - background vocals
 Philip Rose - string engineer
 Jackie Shave - violin
 Alex E. Smith - programming
 Ian Thomas - drums
 Andy Wallace - keyboards
 Diane Warren - composer
 Bruce White - viola
 Shena Winchester - backing vocals
 Tim Woodcock - programming

Charts and certifications

Charts

Certifications

Release history

References

2007 debut albums
Ben Mills albums
Albums produced by Brian Rawling